Bruce Grant may refer to:

Bruce Grant (alpine skier) (1963–1995), New Zealand skier
Bruce Grant (biologist), American biologist
Bruce Grant (writer) (1925–2022), Australian writer, journalist and diplomat